VV, V V, or v. v. may refer  to:

Arts and entertainment
 Vopli Vidopliassova, or VV, a Ukrainian rock band
 Vicarious Visions, a video game company
 V/V, a secondary chord in music
 V.V., a character in Code Geass

People
 Alison Mosshart (born 1978), stage name VV, American singer with The Kills
 Vasily Vorontsov (1847–1918), pseudonym VV, Russian economist and sociologist
 Ville Valo (born 1976), or VV, Finnish musician

Other uses
 v/v (volume by volume), the volume fraction
 VV, an early form of the letter "w"
 Aerosvit Airlines, IATA code VV
 Internal Troops of Russia (Russian: Vnutrenniye Voiska Ministerstva Vnutrennikh Del)
 Public Affairs (political party) (Czech: Věci veřejné), a political party
 Vorontsov-Vel'yaminov Interacting Galaxies, a catalogue of galaxies
 Province of Vibo Valentia, Italy
 V//V, the Intel Viiv platform initiative

See also
 
 
 Double V campaign, World War II slogan promoting democracy overseas African American rights in the U.S.
 Double V (album), a 2017 album by the rapper Mister V
 V de V (disambiguation)
 V&V (disambiguation)
 UU (disambiguation)
 W (disambiguation)
 V (disambiguation)
 Vice Versa (disambiguation)